Airline complaints are any type of formal complaint filed by an airline customer either to the airline responsible for the grievance or the government office responsible for overseeing the airlines national industry.  Airline complaints generally arise out of problems experienced during air travel that were left unresolved.

Airline complaints in the US
According to the Airline Quality Rating 2007 report, airline hassles in the United States have increased since 2005. The rate of complaints, on the other hand, have remained roughly the same, with 0.88 complaints per 100,000, half of which were due to problems with flights or baggage.  This may be due to passengers being more forgiving since 9/11.  However, there is also criticism about whether the number of official complaints truly reflects the experience passengers are encountering, considering the difficulty passengers have in finding out how to issue a formal complaint.  Furthermore, complaints about airline complaints have increased in the US, showing that those who are able to complain, are dissatisfied with the results.

Airline complaints in Europe
In Europe, air passengers have more rights than in the US and must be compensated by law for overbookings, cancellations or flight delays.  After this law (Regulation 261/2004) was introduced in the EU in early 2005, complaints soared, as expected, since more compensation could be expected by passengers who officially complained.  In fact, complaints related to cancellations increased 600% and complaints related to delays increased 500%, not surprisingly since those are categories where increased compensation took effect since the new law.

Airlines receiving most complaints
In the US, Southwest Airlines had the lowest rate of complaints in 2006, with 0.11 complaints per 100,000 passengers, while US Airways and United Airlines had the worst rate of complaints, both with 1.36 complaints per 100,000 passengers.  US Airways is also the US airline with the worst on-time performance, which might explain its rate of complaints.

Government agencies overseeing complaints
In the US, the Department of Transportation is responsible for the airline industry and has a specific division called the Aviation Consumer Protection Service that  handles airline complaints.  They also publish figures on the performance of major US airlines, which are freely accessible on their website.

In the UK, the Civil Aviation Authority can help passengers with complaints about an airline, where passengers have complained to an airline and not been able to resolve their complaint. Alternative dispute resolution (for example mediation or adjudication) is available for passengers travelling in and out of the UK. A list of airlines who have signed up to ADR is published on the CAA's website.

In the European Union, several member countries do not have specific offices to handle airline complaints.  However, the Air Transport Portal of the European Commission handles airline complaints from member countries.

See also
 Transportation Security Administration
 Air safety
 Airport security

References

External links
 Airline Complaints
 US Department of Transportation Aviation Consumer Protection Service
 Canadian Transportation Agency
 Passenger Rights in the European Union

Civil aviation